Christian Arboleda (born 20 February 1997) is an Italian footballer of Colombian descent who plays as a right back for  club Olbia.

Club career
He made his Serie C debut for Arzachena on 27 August 2017 in a game against Arezzo.

After playing for the club in the 2017-18 on loan from Perugia, Arboleda joined Serie D club Arzachena permanently in October 2018. He left the club again the end of the season. However, he rejoined the club on 28 November 2019, signing a deal for the rest of the season.

On 7 August 2020 he signed with Olbia. Arboleda left Olbia in June 2022 and did not play in the first half of the 2022–23 season, before returning to the club on 3 January 2023.

References

External links
 
 

1997 births
Living people
Sportspeople from Perugia
Footballers from Umbria
Italian people of Colombian descent
Sportspeople of Colombian descent
Italian footballers
Association football defenders
Serie C players
Serie D players
A.C. Perugia Calcio players
A.S.D. Città di Foligno 1928 players
L'Aquila Calcio 1927 players
Arzachena Academy Costa Smeralda players
Olbia Calcio 1905 players